Simon Heinrich Adolf Herling (13 October 1780 in Detmold – 1 April 1849 in Frankfurt am Main) was a German philologist and grammarian known for his scholastic treatment of German syntax.

Career 
From 1801 to 1804, he studied theology at the University of Göttingen, afterwards spending several years as a private tutor in Frankfurt am Main. From 1809 to 1849, he worked as an instructor at the gymnasium in Frankfurt, and in the meantime served as a professor of classical languages at the Frankfurt Lyceum (1811–14). He was a founding member (1817) and president of the Frankfurtischen Gelehrtenvereins für Deutsche Sprache.

Works 
Along with philologist Karl Ferdinand Becker, Herling is considered to be a primary representative of the so-called school of "rational grammar" in Germany. His principal writings are:
 Uber die Topik der deutschen Sprache, 1821 – The topic of German language.
 Die Syntax der deutschen Sprache, 1827 – German language syntax.
 Erster cursus eines wissenschaftlichen unterrichts in der deutschen Sprache für Deutsche, 1828.
 Theoretisch-praktisches lehrbuch der stylistik für obere classen höherer schulanstalten, 1837 – Textbook of stylistics.
 Vergleichende Darstellung der Lehre vom Tempus und Modus, 1840 – Comparative studies on the doctrines of tense and mode.
Herling was also the author of several treatises with mathematical and theological themes.

References 

1780 births
1849 deaths
University of Göttingen alumni
People from Detmold
Linguists of German
19th-century German educators
German philologists